Fukura (written: 福良) is a Japanese surname. Notable people with the surname include:

, Japanese baseball player
, Japanese high jumper

See also
Fukura Station, a railway station in Yuza, Yamagata Prefecture, Japan

Japanese-language surnames